Sarah Jayne Adlington (born 5 August 1986) is a British judoka.

Judo career
She has won over 75 medals including becoming champion of Great Britain on six occasions, winning the heavyweight division at the British Judo Championships in 2007, 2008, 2012, 2013, 2014 and 2021.

In 2013, she won the European Open in Rome and in 2015, she won the +78kg gold at the 2015 Oceania Open in Wollongong.

She competed in the 2019 European Games in Minsk, Belarus. In 2020, she was selected to represent Great Britain at the 2020 Summer Olympics in Tokyo but was defeated in the first round of the women's +78 kg category.

She competed for Scotland at the Commonwealth Games in 2014 where she won a gold medal in the Women's +78 kg event and in 2022 where she won another gold medal in the Women's +78 kg event.

Achievements

References

External links
 
 

1986 births
Living people
English female judoka
Commonwealth Games medallists in judo
Commonwealth Games gold medallists for Scotland
Judoka at the 2014 Commonwealth Games
European Games competitors for Great Britain
Judoka at the 2015 European Games
Judoka at the 2019 European Games
Judoka at the 2020 Summer Olympics
Olympic judoka of Great Britain
Sportspeople from Shrewsbury
Judoka at the 2022 Commonwealth Games
Medallists at the 2014 Commonwealth Games
Medallists at the 2022 Commonwealth Games